This page documents all tornadoes confirmed by various weather forecast offices of the National Weather Service in the United States in November 2019. Tornado counts are considered preliminary until final publication in the database of the National Centers for Environmental Information.

United States yearly total

November

November 1 event

November 5 event

November 7 event

November 26 event

November 27 event

November 29 event

November 30 event

December

December 14 event

December 16 event

December 17 event

December 25 event

December 27 event

December 28 event

December 29 event

See also
 Tornadoes of 2019
 List of United States tornadoes from September to October 2019
 List of United States tornadoes in January 2020

Notes

References 

2019 natural disasters in the United States
2019-related lists
Tornadoes of 2019
Tornadoes
2019, 11